Way Down in the Rust Bucket is a live album and concert film from Canadian-American rock musician Neil Young and his band Crazy Horse, released on February 26, 2021. It is Volume 11.5 in the Performance Series of Neil Young Archives.

Recording and release
The album was recorded on November 13, 1990 at The Catalyst in Santa Cruz, CA, where the band was warming up for their upcoming Ragged Glory tour. The show consisted of three sets and an encore, featuring most of recently released Ragged Glory, as well as older fan favourites and deeper cuts. Due to temporary power loss, the multitrack recording of "Cowgirl in the Sand" was damaged; it was decided to remove the song from the CD and LP running order (which also allowed to limit the release format to two CDs/four LPs). "Cowgirl in the Sand" appears only on the DVD version, with dropout sections augmented by lower-fidelity FOH mix. 

Young announced the release on his site on January1, 2020 with the intention to release it that year along with Greendale Live, which was later retitled Return to Greendale, a 2003 rock opera that also features Crazy Horse. This album was initially scheduled to come out on October16, 2020 before being postponed to January15, 2021 and later February26. Young has also previously shown all the concert video footage of this show as part of the Movietone section of his Archives website.

Critical reception

Way Down in the Rust Bucket was met with acclaim from critics. At Metacritic, which assigns a weighted average rating out of 100 to reviews from mainstream publications, this release received an average score of 85 based on 7 reviews.

Track listing
All songs written by Neil Young except as noted.

Disc one

Disc two

DVD

 Country Home
 Surfer Joe and Moe the Sleaze
 Love to Burn
 Days That Used to Be
 Bite the Bullet   
 Cinnamon Girl
 Farmer John 
 Cowgirl in the Sand
 Over and Over
 Danger Bird
 Don't Cry No Tears
 Sedan Delivery
 Roll Another Number (For the Road)
 Fuckin' Up
 T-Bone
 Homegrown
 Mansion on the Hill
 Like a Hurricane 
 Love and Only Love
 Cortez the Killer

Personnel
Neil Young and Crazy Horse
Neil Young– vocals, guitar
Ralph Molina– drums, vocals
Frank Sampedro– guitar, Stringman, vocals
Billy Talbot– bass guitar, vocals
Engineering and production
Neil Young, David Briggs– production
John Hanlon– recording, mixing

Charts

References

External links

Review of the show from Neil Young News

2021 live albums
Neil Young live albums
Crazy Horse (band) albums
albums produced by David Briggs (producer)